Hilliards is an unincorporated village in Washington Township, Butler County, Pennsylvania, United States.  The village of Hilliards started out as a mill town, known as Hilliards Mills (for the owner of the gristmill) and became known as Hilliards Station when the Shenango and Allegheny Railroad extended a small route to the community in 1876 to provide service to local coal and oil industries.  The village of Hilliards became the southern terminal for the line and provided passenger service for the villages of Eau Claire, Argentine, Annisville, North Washington, Higgins Corners, and Whiskerville until 1935.

Eventually, the Bessemer and Lake Erie Railroad would assume control over the line and called it the Hilliards Branch.  In the early 2000s the railroad was abandoned and removed.  The headwaters of the popular Slippery Rock Creek is formed in Hilliards, which continues through northern Butler County, then flows through the scenic McConnells Mill State Park, until it is received by Connoquenessing Creek in Ellwood City.  Today, the community is much quieter than from the railroad days, but is still serviced by a small church and post office.
the post office is now closed and does not service the village of Hilliards any longer.

External links 
1895 history of Butler County, and Hilliards area

Pittsburgh metropolitan area
Unincorporated communities in Butler County, Pennsylvania
Unincorporated communities in Pennsylvania